1978 papal conclave may refer to:

 August 1978 papal conclave, which elected John Paul I to succeed Paul VI
 October 1978 papal conclave, which elected John Paul II to succeed John Paul I